Jan Piecko (born February 3, 1955) is a former Polish ice hockey player who played for the Poland men's national ice hockey team at the 1984 Winter Olympics in Sarajevo.

References

1955 births
Living people
Ice hockey players at the 1984 Winter Olympics
Olympic ice hockey players of Poland
Polish ice hockey left wingers
Sportspeople from Katowice